Frederick Ian Allison Lawson (born 24 March 1939) is an English former professional footballer who played for Burnley, Leeds United, Crystal Palace and Port Vale in the 1950s and 1960s. He scored 34 goals in 99 league games in a 12-year career in the English Football League. He won the First Division title with Burnley in 1959–60, and won the Second Division title with Leeds United in 1963–64.

Career

Burnley
Lawson started his career as an amateur at Burnley after being scouted in a local School's cup final, along with James Robson. He scored four goals on his debut in a 7–0 victory over Chesterfield. Despite some good times, including a purple patch in the "Clarets" 1957 FA Cup run, Lawson found it hard to break into the highly successful first team. During this period Burnley were competing at the top of the First Division, and were crowned champions of the English Football League in 1959–60 under the stewardship of Harry Potts. After spending six seasons at Turf Moor, during which he made only 23 appearances, the 23-year-old was sold to Leeds United for £20,000 in March 1962.

Leeds United
He joined Leeds as they battled to avoid relegation to the Third Division and went straight into Don Revie's first team, where he scored once in eleven games. He made a bigger impact during the 1963–64 Second Division promotion season when he scored eleven goals in 24 matches, but his place in the first team was taken by Alan Peacock, who joined Leeds in February 1964, and Lawson made only three further appearances at Elland Road before joining Crystal Palace in June 1966 for a fee of £9,000.

Later career
Dick Graham's Palace team finished 11th in the Second Division in 1965–66, and Lawson scored six goals in 17 league games at Selhurst Park. He was signed by Port Vale manager Jackie Mudie in August 1966 for a £1,000 fee. He went straight into the first team, making his debut at Vale Park in a 2–1 win over Southport on 20 August. However, he lost his place the following month and was limited to one goal in ten league and cup games in the 1966–67 season. He was given a free transfer to Fourth Division rivals Barnsley in May 1967. He never made a first team appearance for Johnny Steele's "Tykes" before announcing his retirement from professional football after leaving Oakwell.

Career statistics
Source:

Honours
Burnley
Football League First Division: 1959–60

Leeds United
Football League Second Division: 1963–64

References

1939 births
Living people
Footballers from County Durham
People from County Durham (district)
English footballers
Association football forwards
Burnley F.C. players
Leeds United F.C. players
Crystal Palace F.C. players
Port Vale F.C. players
Barnsley F.C. players
English Football League players